This was a new event in the ITF Women's Circuit.

Misa Eguchi and Eri Hozumi won the inaugural title, defeating Lauren Embree and Asia Muhammad in the final, 7–6(15–13), 1–6, [14–12].

Seeds

Draw

References 
 Draw

Canberra Tennis International - Doubles
2015 in Australian tennis
2015